Continuity of operations can mean:
Continuity of government, defined procedures that allow a government to continue its essential operations in case of a catastrophic event
Continuity of Government Commission, a nonpartisan think tank established in 2002 in the United States
United States federal government continuity of operations